Rudkhaneh-ye Soltani (also Romanized as Rūdkhāneh-ye Solţānī, Roodkhaneh Soltani, and Rūdkhāneh Solţānī; also known as Solţānī and Sultāni) is a village in Dashtab Rural District, in the Central District of Baft County, Kerman Province, Iran. At the 2006 census, its population was 122, in 40 families.

References 

Populated places in Baft County